Ernesto Filippi Cavani (born 26 October 1950 in Lucca, Italy) is a former Uruguayan football referee. He is known for supervising one match during the 1994 FIFA World Cup in the United States.

References
Profile

1950 births
Living people
Uruguayan football referees
FIFA World Cup referees
Copa América referees
1994 FIFA World Cup referees